Devsar is a village in the Bhiwani district of the Indian state of Haryana. , the village had 2,351 households with a total population of 12,488 of which 6,603 were male and 5,885 female.

References

Villages in Bhiwani district